William J. Sharkey ( 1847 – after 1873) was a New York City politician and convicted murderer who earned national notoriety in the late 19th century for escaping from a New York prison disguised as a woman. He subsequently fled to Cuba, which at the time was part of the Spanish Empire, and not subject to extradition treaties. Sharkey was never captured, and his ultimate fate is unknown.

Early life 
Born in New York City around 1847, William Sharkey came from a respected and well-to-do family. A physical description of Sharkey in his late twenties stated that he was about five foot seven inches (5'7"), had high cheekbones, dark hair, and a “thin face somewhat feminine in appearance ... the eyes sharp and clear.” Contemporary sources described him as handsome, well-dressed, interesting, and confident. Sharkey decided at an early age to adopt the "flash life" of a burglar, pickpocket, gambler, and "sporting man." Sharkey's gang, the Sharkey Guard, was described as “a gang of young gentlemen of questionable habits.”

Political career 
Sharkey's early adulthood coincided with the rise to power of William Tweed, whose Tammany Hall political machine had seized control of the city, and engaged in systemic political corruption. Sharkey and his gang soon came to the attention of Tweed and his associates, who saw an opportunity to feed Sharkey's ambition, while serving their own goals. With their assistance, Sharkey became a “politician of no mean influence ... He was a power in the Eighth Ward primaries, had a club named after him, and belonged to every influential political organization in the fifth congressional district.”

Sharkey's political career appeared to wane, however, when “once receiving the nomination for Assistant Alderman, he was ... defeated by internal dissensions in the Tammany Party ... He was nursed and petted until all his lambs had been brought into the fold, and then Tammany betrayed him.” Sharkey returned to his old ways: “After this, he gave up hopes of office, and devoted himself to the pursuit of his ordinary avocations, gambling, and stealing.”

Murder of Robert S. Dunn 
In 1872, Sharkey traveled to Buffalo, New York, and invested in a faro bank, a popular card game in 19th-century America, but also a game widely known for rampant cheating by both players and dealers. He lost $4,000 in five days. Returning to New York City, Sharkey recruited an associate named Robert S. Dunn, a professional gambler who also held a position as a public servant in the office of the Comptroller, and provided him with $600 to win back the money Sharkey lost. Dunn, who also used the alias “Bob Isaacs,” apparently lost as well, and returned to New York City empty-handed.

The next time Sharkey and Dunn were in the same company was at the funeral of James Reilly, a politician known to both men. They marched in the funeral procession together, and subsequently convened with other friends at a local bar. According to one source, Sharkey accused Dunn of reneging on his obligation to repay him—even though Dunn had recently won $1,500. Armed with a pistol, he shot and killed Dunn, then fled. Sharkey remained at large for only a short time, having made it known to the police that he wanted to surrender. He was arrested by Captain Ira S. Garland, and placed in a Manhattan jail to await trial.

Trial 
Sharkey's trial was a sensation at the time. Each day, large crowds convened to catch a glimpse of the accused. The trial was covered extensively by The New York Times.

Sharkey was charged with premeditated murder, a crime punishable by death under state law. His defense attorneys argued that although Sharkey indisputably killed Dunn, there was no way to know if it was premeditated. The jury could thus only find him guilty of manslaughter. During the trial, one witness declined to answer (on fear of self-incrimination) whether he had been bribed with $500 to give testimony favorable to the defense. On 21 June 1873, the jury found Sharkey guilty of premeditated murder, with a recommendation to mercy. The defense requested a retrial on procedural grounds, and the court convened again on the 23rd and 29th of June 1873 to consider the motion, which was ultimately denied. 

On 3 July 1873, Sharkey was formally sentenced to be hanged on Friday, 15 August 1873. Subsequent to that, one of his attorneys filed a formal appeal, which was granted on 7 August 1873. Sharkey seemed unmoved by the proceedings; according to contemporary accounts, he “did not betray the slightest emotion,” and appeared “in the best of spirits.”

Confinement 
Throughout the trial and subsequent sentencing, Sharkey was confined in a prison adjacent to the courthouse called The Tombs. By most accounts, he was a troublesome inmate. One author noted, “He became so violent in his demonstrations that Warden Johnson ordered that he be locked up and put in close confinement,” and that Sharkey was “continually insolent and abusive to his keeper.” The Times reported that Sharkey attempted to stab one of the prison keepers. He was placed in solitary confinement, kept under close surveillance, and the door of his cell remained closed, except to receive meals. Yet, some accounts implied a life of relative luxury and privilege; Walling noted, “The cell was richly fitted up, and the occupant evidently was not leading a very restricted life.” On 6 August 1873, the day before Sharkey's appeal was granted, he was reportedly found under the influence of “intoxicating liquors, though from what source these have been obtained the Warden has been unable to find out.”

Escape 
On 22 November 1873, Sharkey's lover, Maggie Jourdan, visited him in The Tombs with another woman, Sarah Allen, whose husband was also confined there. Although both women were given passes to enter and exit the prison, neither were searched by the guards. After visiting Sharkey for an indeterminate period of time, Jourdan presented her exit pass to the guards at the prison gate and left. Between one and one-half hours later, a second woman presented a pass at the gate, and exited the prison. Dressed in a black coat and hat, her face concealed by a veil, she was later described as “large and rather masculine in appearance.” About an hour later, Allen tried to exit the prison, but was stopped when she failed to produce a pass.

The keeper of The Tombs realized immediately that something was amiss. Allen was held for questioning, and a search of each cell ordered. When the guards reached Sharkey's cell, “they discovered that its occupant was not there. The door was unlocked, and Sharkey's clothing lay on the floor. On a little shelf, some locks of hair were found, which were supposed to be the remains of the murderer's mustache.”

The last sighting of Sharkey was from a guard who noticed a “peculiar-looking woman” jump aboard a fast-moving street car. The guard later remarked that he was “somewhat surprised to see the nimble way in which she alighted on a car, which was going at the time at considerable speed.” At the time, the escape was considered “the most daring and unparalleled break-jail in the history of this country.”

Speculation immediately arose about accomplices. The Times speculated that Sharkey had “the assistance and cooperation of persons equally as skilled as himself.” That source cited a "rumor" that two guards had been placed under arrest. According to one account, Jourdan “had taken an impression in wax of the lock on her lover's cell, and assisted by Sharkey's confederates outside the prison, had managed to have a key made.” She was arrested immediately after the escape, but subsequently released due to lack of evidence. The superintendent of police thought “the plan of escape has been arranged for some time, and was not a thing of a moment's decision, as the prison authorities would pretend.” Despite the offer of a $2,000 reward for his capture and an extensive search, Sharkey was never found.

Life as a fugitive 
The details of Sharkey's subsequent life as a fugitive are speculative. He remained in New York City for several weeks after his escape. Sometime between late 1873 and early 1874, he booked passage to Cuba under the name "Frank Campbell" aboard the schooner Frank Atwood. Cuba, which at the time was part of the Spanish Empire, had no extradition treaty with the United States. Coincidentally, Tweed also fled to Cuba aboard the Frank Atwood in 1873 after escaping from jail, where he was imprisoned for corruption charges. 

Sharkey lived for a while in Cuba, allegedly visiting the American consulate in Havana to read about himself in the New York papers. His occupation or source of income were unknown, although “he seemed to have plenty of money, and in answer to some inquiries made, he stated that his brothers furnished him with all he wanted from New York.” Jourdan joined Sharkey in Cuba around 1876, and they subsequently married. She later returned to the U.S., an apparent victim of spousal abuse.

In March 1875, it was reported that Sharkey was arrested while trying to sail to South America, and that his return to New York was imminent. In July 1896, 21 years after his supposed extradition, an article appeared indicating that Sharkey had entered the military service in South America. In June 1900, 28 years after his escape, the Auckland Star reported that Sharkey was “located in Southern Spain, where he is eking out an existence as a guide, and the police have information which should result in his capture.” In March 1931, at which time Sharkey, if alive, would have been about 88 years old, Herbert Asbury wrote simply, “They never found Sharkey.”

See also 

List of fugitives from justice who disappeared

References 

1847 births
American escapees
American people convicted of murder
Criminals from New York City
Escapees from New York (state) detention
Fugitives wanted by the United States
Year of death missing